Holloway Street District is a national historic district located at Durham, Durham County, North Carolina. The district encompasses 116 contributing buildings and 2 contributing structures in a predominantly residential section of Durham. They were built between the 1880s and 1945 and include notable examples of Classical Revival, Queen Anne, Colonial Revival and Bungalow / American Craftsman style architecture.

It was listed on the National Register of Historic Places in 1985, with a boundary increase in 2009.

References

Historic districts on the National Register of Historic Places in North Carolina
Queen Anne architecture in North Carolina
Colonial Revival architecture in North Carolina
Neoclassical architecture in North Carolina
Historic districts in Durham, North Carolina
National Register of Historic Places in Durham County, North Carolina
Neighborhoods in Durham, North Carolina